Rear Admiral Maxine Conder (April 20, 1926 – October 18, 2021) was a United States Navy rear admiral who served as Director of the United States Navy Nurse Corps from 1975 to 1979.

Early life
Born in 1926, Maxine Conder was a native of the state of Utah. She earned her nursing diploma in 1947 from St. Marks Hospital School of Nursing in Salt Lake City, Utah. She was a member of the Church of Jesus Christ of Latter-day Saints.

Education
In 1962, Conder earned a Bachelor of Science degree from the University of Utah. In 1966, she earned a master's degree in nursing from the University of Washington.

Navy Nurse Corps career

After several assignments as chief nurse, she was promoted to the rank of captain in 1970. 

As Director of the Navy Nurse Corps, she became the second woman promoted to the rank of rear admiral.

Personal life
Conder died in Layton, Utah, on October 18, 2021, at the age of 95.

Awards and decorations
Rear Admiral Conder was awarded the Legion of Merit.

References

Further reading

External links
 Nurses and the U.S. Navy -- Overview and Special Image Selection Naval Historical Center

1926 births
2021 deaths
American nursing administrators
United States Navy personnel of the Korean War
United States Navy personnel of the Vietnam War
American female military personnel of the Vietnam War
Female admirals of the United States Navy
United States Navy rear admirals
Recipients of the Legion of Merit
United States Navy Nurse Corps officers
Women in warfare post-1945
Women in war in East Asia
Vietnam War nurses
Female wartime nurses
People from Bingham Canyon, Utah
American women nurses